James Aloysius McNulty (January 16, 1900 – September 4, 1972) was an American clergyman of the Roman Catholic Church. He served as bishop of the Diocese of Paterson in New Jersey (1953–1963) and bishop of the Diocese of Buffalo in New York (1963–1972).  He previously served as an auxiliary bishop of the Archdiocese of Newark in New Jersey (1947-1953).

Biography

Early life and education
James McNulty was born on January 16, 1900, in New York City.  He was educated at Seton Hall College and Immaculate Conception Seminary in South Orange, New Jersey, where he earned a Master of Arts degree in 1923. He made his theological studies at the Catholic University of Leuven in Leuven, Belgium.

Ordination and ministry
McNulty was ordained to the priesthood for the Archdiocese of Newark on July 12, 1925. His younger brother, John L. McNulty, was ordained at the same liturgy (and later served as President of Seton Hall University from 1949 to 1959).

James McNulty did pastoral work in Jersey City and Newark, both in New Jersey, and served as diocesan director of the Confraternity of Christian Doctrine, moderator of the Mount Carmel Guild, and director of Catholic Youth Organization. He served on the faculty of the Teachers' Institute for Religious for five years.

Auxiliary Bishop of Newark
On August 2, 1947, McNulty was appointed auxiliary bishop of the Archdiocese of Newark and Titular Bishop of Methone by Pope Pius XII. He received his episcopal consecration on October 7, 1947, from Archbishop Thomas Walsh, with Bishops William A. Griffin and Henry Joseph O'Brien serving as co-consecrators.

Bishop of Paterson
McNulty was named the third bishop of the Diocese of Paterson by Pius XII on April 9, 1953. His tenure there was marked by an increase in new parishes and schools. He also served as chairman of the U.S. Bishops' Committee for Motion Pictures, Radio and Television; in this capacity he condemned "'fast buck' horror, pseudoscience and crime films aimed especially at youngsters," saying such films imperil the moral health and intellectual development of children.

Bishop of Buffalo

On February 12, 1963, Pope John XXIII appointed McNulty as the tenth bishop of the Diocese of Buffalo. He reduced the diocesan debt which stood at $30 million through a three-year Diocesan Development Fund.

McNulty oversaw the implementation of the Decrees of Vatican II including the establishment of the Priests' Senate. A good number of new parishes were established and former Missionary Apostolate parishes became independent. Many parishes built new church buildings. McNulty promoted religious vocations, expanded inner city ministry, established the Liturgical Commission, the Pastoral Council, a Lay Steering Committee to oversee finances, and the Communications Office. McNulty began the television program The Bishop Visits Your Home.

James McNulty died in Montclair, New Jersey, on September 4, 1972, at age 72. His body is buried next to his parents in East Hanover, New Jersey.

References

Episcopal succession

1972 deaths
Participants in the Second Vatican Council
Seton Hall University alumni
1900 births
American Roman Catholics
20th-century Roman Catholic bishops in the United States
Roman Catholic bishops of Paterson
Roman Catholic bishops of Buffalo